Dino Ćorić (born 30 June 1990) is a Bosnian professional footballer who plays as a defender or as a midfielder for Bosnian Premier League club Borac Banja Luka.

Honours
Široki Brijeg
Bosnian Cup: 2012–13, 2016–17

Borac Banja Luka
Bosnian Premier League: 2020–21

References

External links
Dino Ćorić at UEFA
Dino Ćorić at Sofascore

1990 births
Living people
People from Široki Brijeg
Croats of Bosnia and Herzegovina
Bosnia and Herzegovina footballers
Premier League of Bosnia and Herzegovina players
NK Široki Brijeg players
HŠK Posušje players
FK Borac Banja Luka players
Bosnia and Herzegovina under-21 international footballers
Association football defenders
Association football midfielders